Molino is a census-designated place (CDP) in Escambia County, Florida, United States. The population was 1,277 at the 2010 census. It is part of the Pensacola–Ferry Pass–Brent Metropolitan Statistical Area.

Geography
Molino is located at  (30.719568, -87.325664).

Demographics

As of the census of 2000, there were 1,312 people, 468 households, and 356 families residing in the CDP. The racial makeup of the CDP was 71.42% White, 24.70% African American, 0.61% Native American, 0.30% Asian, 0.38% from other races, and 2.59% from two or more races. Hispanic or Latino of any race were 0.84% of the population.

There were 468 households, out of which 38.0% had children under the age of 18 living with them, 57.9% were married couples living together, 13.7% had a female householder with no husband present, and 23.9% were non-families. 21.4% of all households were made up of individuals, and 10.9% had someone living alone who was 65 years of age or older.  The average household size was 2.80 and the average family size was 3.26.

In the CDP, the population was spread out, with 30.2% under the age of 18, 6.9% from 18 to 24, 29.1% from 25 to 44, 21.6% from 45 to 64, and 12.2% who were 65 years of age or older.  The median age was 35 years. For every 100 females, there were 105.0 males.  For every 100 females age 18 and over, there were 94.1 males.

The median income for a household in the CDP was $31,793, and the median income for a family was $38,889. Males had a median income of $40,550 versus $21,438 for females. The per capita income for the CDP was $14,334.  About 10.7% of families and 12.7% of the population were below the poverty line, including 19.1% of those under age 18 and 10.5% of those age 65 or over.

Notable people
 Joe Durant, professional golfer. 
 Don Sutton, grew up in Molino. Former Major League Baseball pitcher.

References

Pensacola metropolitan area
Census-designated places in Escambia County, Florida
Census-designated places in Florida
Former municipalities in Florida